The Couven Museum is a museum in Aachen, Germany.

References

External links 

History museums in Germany
Museums established in 1929